Vijay Pal Singh (born 1 January 1967) is a former Indian pole vaulter from Haryana who became the first Indian pole vaulter to clear 5.00 meters. He holds the current national record of 5.10 metres set in Thiruvananthapuram in 1987. It is one of the longest surviving national records in Indian athletics.

Vijay Pal was born in Haryana.

References

External links

Indian male pole vaulters
Athletes from Haryana
1967 births
Living people
Male pole vaulters